Baddies is a reality television series that premiered on May 16, 2021, on the Zeus Network. It was developed following an episode of The Conversation, which featured cast members from the former Oxygen series Bad Girls Club, that aired on Zeus in December 2020.

Its first season, Baddies ATL, premiered on May 16, 2021. It was followed by the second season Baddies South, and the third season, Baddies West, which premiered on June 12, 2022 and January 22, 2023 respectively.

Development 
Talks for a potential reboot of the Bad Girls Club came about in early 2019 when Natalie Nunn announced that a reunion special was in the works. The reunion initially included Nunn, Gabrielle Victor and Danielle Victor from Season 8: Las Vegas, Christina Salgado and Erika “Lucci Vee” Jordan from Season 9: Mexico, Raquel "Rocky" Santiago and Shannon Sarich from Season 10: Atlanta, Sarah Oliver from Season 11: Miami, and Jada Cacchilli from Season 12: Chicago. The plan also included Tanisha Thomas from season 2, despite production disputes with Nunn.

The reunion was initially developed for release on the adult platform OnlyFans, with uncensored material made available for a particular price. Gabrielle, Danielle and Erika eventually quit and were replaced by Tiana Small from Season 11: Miami.

In December 2020, Natalie, Christina, Rocky, Shannon, Sarah and Jada appeared together on an episode of The Conversation to confront their issues surrounding the OnlyFans project. On February 14, 2021, Zeus Network released a teaser trailer for Baddies ATL, which would reunite several former Bad Girls Club cast members.

Cast

Timeline of cast members

Series overview

Baddies ATL (2021)
The first series, Baddies ATL, ran for ten episodes from May 16, 2021, to July 25, 2021.

Synopsis
According to the Zeus Network's website Baddies ATL is where "The original bad girls of reality television reconnect in the ATL to reminisce, bring the fireworks, settle old beefs and prove that being bad girls is not just who they are…but what they do." The show was filmed in a mansion in Atlanta, Georgia.

Reunion 
The final episode was followed by a two-part reunion special, hosted by singer Tamar Braxton and Jason Lee, which was released on August 15, 2021, and August 22, 2021.

Cast

Main

Guest

Cast duration

Baddies South (2022)
The second series, Baddies South, began streaming for 14 episodes from June 12, 2022 to September 18, 2022

Synopsis
This season of the show shows all of the cast members travelling from Atlanta, Georgia, to Charlotte, North Carolina, to Nashville, Tennessee, to New Orleans, Louisiana, and to  Houston, Texas. The description says on the Zeus Network website "The Baddies are back, but this time with some new ladies looking to take the entire Dirty South by storm — in a big a**, decked-out tour bus. Along the way, the ladies will crash in luxurious homes, host and perform at the hottest clubs and parties, tap into the wild and dark side of southern culture and prove why they are the baddest girls around."

Reunion
The franchise featured a three-part reunion. Part 1 aired on September 25, 2022, Part 2 aired on October 2, 2022, and Part 3 aired on October 9, 2022. The reunion was hosted by Trina and Janeisha John.

Cast

Main

Guest

Cast duration

Baddies West (2023) 
On Saturday, September 24, 2022, Natalie Nunn announced that she was going to begin casting for a third season, this called, Baddies West. Casting began Sept. 30th in the San Francisco Bay Area in California. The first episode aired on January 22, 2023.

Baddies West Auditions 
A special for the auditions was announced. Baddies West: Auditions is a three-part special, with Part 1 airing on October 23, 2022 and concluding with Part 3 on November 6, 2022, in which producers are trying to find new Baddies for the third season (Baddies West). This special features judges Natalie Nunn, Love and Hip Hop Atlanta's Tommie Lee and Love and Hip Hop Miami's Sukihana. Rollie, Jela, Bri, Scotty (from Season 2) all make appearances as pre-screen judges. The cast was confirmed on November 7, 2022.

Teasers and Trailers 
An official teaser for "Baddies West" was dropped Sunday December 2022 at 8:00pm. On Sunday January 15th the final super trailer for “Baddies West” was dropped.

Synopsis 
This season shows all of the cast members as they travel from Los Angeles to
Las Vegas, Phoenix, Arizona, Oakland, California, and Portland, Oregon. As they travel they form sister circles as relationships crumble while some relationships strengthen. As the women grow, communicate, and interact they learn new things about themselves as they strive to get the bag and prove why they’re indeed the Baddies of the West.

Cast

Cast duration

Notes

References

2020s American reality television series
2021 American television series debuts
English-language television shows
Television shows set in Atlanta
Bad Girls Club